Nováci is a Czech sitcom that ran for two seasons beginning in 1995. The sitcom's main storyline revolves around a Czech family called Nováci. The family hosts an American student of sociology, Jeremy Washington, who eventually purchases a home from a family involved with the Russian mafia.

Season 1
Nováci's first season, which ran from 19 April 1995 to 27 December 1995, included 72 episodes.

Season 2
In January 1996, production began on Season 2 (sometimes called Nováci 2), which had 52 episodes. This was essentially a new series with a new plot, new characters, new actors, and new writers. Only the director Jiří Adamec remained from the original production staff.

Cast

Season 1 

 Ota Jirák as father Novák
 Jana Janěková as mother Nováková
 Filip Rajmont as son
 Jitka Ježková as daughter
 Paulo Nanque as Jerry

Season 2 

 Pavel Zedníček as father Novák
 Jana Paulová as mother Nováková
 Jitka Schneiderová as daughter
 Robert Galia as son

Czech comedy television series
1990s sitcoms
1995 Czech television series debuts